Minnich is a surname. Notable people with the surname include:

 L. Arthur Minnich (1918–1990), American civil servant
 Minnie Minnich (1889–1941), American politician
 Nelson Minnich (born 1942), American historian and author
 James M. Minnich (born 1964), American army colonel retired, professor and author.

See also
 Minnick
 Minich
 Minick (disambiguation)
 Minik (disambiguation)

References